Lok Priya Devi (1898–1960) was a Nepalese poet. In 2014, she was recognised as one of the women who contributed to the arena of Nepali literature, art, and politics. She is the sister of Laxmi Prasad Devkota, the nation's most adored poet.

Biography 
Devi was born in 1898 in Dilli Bazar, Kathmandu, Nepal to Teel Madhav Devkota, and Amar Rajya Lakshmi Devi. Devi was a sister of Laxmi Prasad Devkota, who is considered to be the greatest literary figure in Nepal.

In 1906 at the age of eight years, Devi was married to businessman Lok Nath Joshi. They had five sons and three daughters, however, Joshi was known to be a womaniser and he had many concubines. Devi is never known to have criticised her husband. Devi's name "Lok Priya" was given to her by Joshi which means "darling of Lok Nath".

Works 
Her brother Devkota used to encourage her to write poems. She was a student of Lekhnath Paudyal and Chakrapani Chalise. Devi's works were also praised by various writers including Prem Rajeshwari Devi, Goma, and Devkota. 

She mostly published her poems in Sharada magazine, and she also published in Udyog, Sahity Shrot, and the literary supplements to the national newspaper Gorkhapatra. Devi was also an activist, she advocated and encouraged women to get an education. In 1953, she organised a literacy event for Bhanubhakta Acharya.

In 1983, her daughter Shashi Rimal, compiled and published Collected Poems of Poetess Lokpriya Devi. Lok Priya Devi Puraskar is named in her honour.

Awards and recognitions 
In 2014, she was recognised one of the women "who contributed to the arena of Nepali literature, art, and politics. Much of their lives have been excluded [or written very little] from the narratives of official records", alongside Ambalika Devi Chandrakala Devi, Mangala Devi, and Divya Koirala.

She died in 1960.

Works 

 Shoka Bindu
 Tears of Sorrow on Brother’s Demise
 Collected Poems of Poetess Lokpriya Devi
 Reply to Shanta

References

Further reading 

 

1898 births
1960 deaths
20th-century Nepalese women writers
20th-century Nepalese writers
Nepalese writers
People from Kathmandu
Nepalese poets
20th-century Nepalese poets
Nepalese women poets
Nepali-language poets